Cephalonomia tarsalis is a idiobiont ectoparasitoid hymenopteran in the family Bethylidae. Known hosts include: Oryzaephilus surinamensis, Sitophilus granarius, Sitophilus oryzae, Sitophilus zeamais, and Tribolium castaneum.

Biology 
On Oryzaephilus surinamensis, fertilized females C. tarsalis lay on average 85 eggs and non-fertilized females lay on average 50 eggs. Adult lifespan is on average 35 days for females and 6 days for males at room temperature. Adult females need to host-feed to initiate oviposition. Upon paralyzing a host (a beetle larva or pupa) the female typically lays 2 eggs (one female and one male) onto the host's body. When 2 larvae develop on the same host they develop on average in 2/3 the time required for a solitary larva to develop. The life cycle is completed in ~20 days at room temperature on Oryzaephilus surinamensis. Cocoons can overwinter. Males emerge 2 days prior to females. Males enter the cocoon of pharate females to mate. A male will mate with multiple females but females mate only once.

Distribution  
Cephalonomia tarsalis has been reported from India, the US, and the United Kingdom.

References

Hymenoptera
Parasitic wasps